The Salzhaus ( Salt House) is a historic building in the German city Frankfurt am Main. It forms the northeastern part of the Frankfurt City Hall complex (Römer), on the Römerberg square in the centre of the Altstadt (old town).

The Salzhaus was originally built around 1600. It had a rich carved façade on the gable side, making it not only the most important artisan-produced civil building in the city, but also one of the greatest achievements of the Renaissance in the German-speaking world. This building was largely destroyed in World War Two by aerial bombing in March 1944. The base of the old building was preserved, but the floors above it were rebuilt in 1951/52 in a simple post-war architectural form. The reconstruction of the historic facade is still under discussion; it was considered in the 1980s along with a row of houses on the other side of the square (the Ostzeile) but was not carried out. Since then, the organisation Friends of Frankfurt have continued this discussion.

Historic Architecture 
Like most of the buildings in Frankfurt's old town, the Salzhaus was built on a massive ground floor made of local red sandstone. As the only part of the building that has been preserved almost holistically to this day, the mastery of the Frankfurt stone masonry is still evident today.

The half-timbered part of the building rose above the stone ground floor into two upper and upper cantilever levels, cantilevering north and east. From the ground floor to the gable, the building was 22 metres high, and at the widest point only 10 metres across. The fact that the roof structure alone made up almost half of the total height of the building emphasised the late Gothic proportions, despite the rich Renaissance decorations.

Probably shortly after 1595 the house was completely redesigned in the style of the late Renaissance, or probably even completely rebuilt. From then on, the Salzhaus was considered one of the most beautiful buildings in Central Europe.
The facade of the Römerberg was painted in the red, white and gold colours of Frankfurt, as shown by a hand-coloured copper engraving from the coronation diary of Joseph I in 1705, and was also documented by the remains of paint from the renovation of the building at the end of the 19th century. The colours were likely changed in the second half of the 18th century as a result of classical architects attempts to give half-timbered buildings the appearance of stone buildings.

The Frankfurter Salzhaus was not only a rarity in the entire German half-timbered building, but especially for the city itself. The Gothic style continued very long in Frankfurt, even as far as the early 18th century, the Renaissance found a very muted reception and wealth of jewelry was frowned upon within the population. The few richly decorated half-timbered buildings came almost exclusively from immigrants,  whose preferences differed from the conservative citizens.

Therefore, the Salzhaus was an  rarity in Frankfurt's architectural history. The art historian Fried Lübbecke wrote in 1924 on its further significance: "[The] entire facade of the Römerberg, up to the gable, is covered with precious oak carvings. They belong to the most technically and artistically perfect of the whole German Renaissance. The crispness of the late Gothic combines the clarity of southern formation to a harmony that is rare in the north."

In terms of comparable quality, the Kammerzell House in Strasbourg gives a similar impression, since it was similarly splendidly redesigned in 1589, but in contrast it survived not only the Franco-Prussian war, but also both world wars without damage.

History 
The first mention of the building goes back to a document dated May 5, 1324. It was being referred to as the Salzhaus in various documents in the 14th century, which derived from the salt trade taking place there.
It is likely that until the early 17th century there were two independent, very narrow half-timbered buildings on the plot, commonly known as the Salzhaus. This is shown both by pictures of the Römerberg from various older coronation records.

In around 1460, the Salzhaus was a private debt prison. Private prisons were are common in medieval Frankfurt, regulated by precise urban regulations. The prison in the Salzhaus was in the cellar vault, where a kind of cage had been constructed with the help of wooden slats.

Little is known about the history of the Salzhaus in the following two centuries. Due to its impressive design, the spacious cellars, the availability of a shop on the ground floor and its optimal location on the Römerberg, it would have been almost exclusively owned by rich Frankfurt merchant families.

On May 1, 1843, the city acquired the house and integrated it with the Frauenstein house to create a building complex around the Römerberg square. Since the demolition of the neighbouring Haus zum Wedel in 1866, the building made a somewhat skewed impression. This was due to the fact that the upper floors protruded only to the north, without compensation on the (built-in) southern side, and the overall construction had warped very little over the centuries. The apparent urban dependency on the neighbouring house initially suggests that it was built at the same time, if not before. The detailed plan of the city by Matthäus Merian from 1628, in which the Haus zum Wedel cannot be recognised, on the other hand, points to an erection only from the second third of the 17th century.

In the years 1887 to 1888, urgently needed renovation took place.under the direction of urban planning inspector Adolf Koch was tackled. The modular construction of the oak panels on the first floor made it easy to remove them and take them to the workshops of carpenters and sculptors, where they were extensively restored .

At the time of the renovation work, the frescoes on the north front of the building were so badly weathered that it was decided not to restore them but to replace them entirely. After making detailed sketches of the pictures, the old plaster was removed and completely replaced. Only after the plaster had dried for about a year from the summer of 1887 to 1888 and had proven its strength, were the previously documented pictures repainted using stable mineral colours. Finally, the foliage surrounding the gable, of which there was little left, was copied and completely replaced on the basis of the remains. City officials moved into the house in 1890.

Destruction in the Second World War 
In the Second World War it became apparent from July 1942 at the latest that Frankfurt would also be the target of heavy bombing. A large part of the historically significant buildings in the old town of Frankfurt was then documented and immovable art monuments were walled in or had the historic parts removed,. These included all removable relief panels from the Salzhaus - only the carvings worked into the supporting beams of the actual half-timbered house had to remain on site.

On October 5, 1943, the first heavy bomb attack hit the city centre. Incendiary bombs devastated the interior of the Roman and the civil hall. The neighbouring salt house was initially spared. On March 18, 1944, about 750 aircraft attacked the eastern city centre. The Salzhaus remained undamaged again, although the Paulskirche on the opposite side of the street was hit and burned out completely.

On March 22, the heaviest air raid hit the old town. More than seven thousand buildings were destroyed or badly damaged. The Salzhaus was also hit by incendiary bombs and burned down. The entire interior was lost, only parts of the stone basement remained.

Post-war building to present 

In 1946, work began on clearing the debris in the old town. By 1950 the rubble and ruins had been completely removed. In that time the decision had been made for a modern reconstruction based on the ideas of urban planning at the time. The “New Salzhaus” was completed in 1952.

There was a serious discussion about the pros and cons of a possible reconstruction of the Salzhaus. However, there was an architectural community and also large parts of politics, which were opposed to "historicism of the romantic kind" (Mayor Kurt Blaum), and still a great shortage of materials and finance.

Most of the initially submitted designs provided for simple and cheaply constructed cubist buildings for the Salzhaus, against which politicians decided in January 1951 in favour of gabled buildings in order to maintain the symmetry of the appearance towards the Römerberg.

Nevertheless, the new Salzhaus belongs to the small number of buildings from the early 1950s which are to be regarded as an artistic contribution of a time that is primarily determined by material constraints.

The “Salzhaus” of the post-war period is a modern reinforced concrete building on the preserved ground floor of the previous building. The decoration of the new building, on the other hand, is unusually rich for the time it was built. Below the windows there is limestone cladding, the eastern side is occupied by a glass mosaic spanning the three full storeys by the artist Wilhelm Geißler. It is intended to symbolise the mood of development and departure after the war and shows the motif of the phoenix from the ashes.

Finally, the six wooden relief panels by the sculptor Johann Michael Hocheisen from 1595 were incorporated into the new front on the Römerberg instead of on the first floor of the original building. They are located in pairs below the southernmost or left side of the house for the observer standing in front of it and still give a good impression of the high quality of the historic Salzhaus.

Today the city's Salzhaus serves as an administration building with an information centre for tourists on the ground floor.

Possible reconstruction 
The original historical building has still not disappeared from the city's collective memory. In the 1980s, there were still efforts by the citizens to rebuild the Salzhaus true to the original in the course of the reconstruction of the east line of the Römerberg, which only failed due to a lack of money.

An exhibition of the fragments in the Historisches Museum Frankfurt in December 2004 also showed that not as much building substance was lost in the Second World War as is generally assumed - around 60% of the facade is still intact in city archives. In 2008, on the occasion of the planned reconstruction of some important Frankfurt town houses on the area of the Technical City Hall, which was to be demolished in 2009, the documentation Spolia of the old town of Frankfurt was published. It also shows for the first time an inventory plan of the preserved façade parts of the salt house, which according to the study "should be incorporated into the new building of the Historical Museum as outstanding spolia".

Literature 

 Architects & Engineers Association (ed.): Frankfurt am Main and its buildings . Self-published by the association, Frankfurt am Main 1886
 Johann Georg Battonn: Local Description of the City of Frankfurt am Main - Volume IV . Association for History and Ancient History of Frankfurt am Main, Frankfurt am Main 1866, pp. 142–143
 Hartwig Beseler, Niels Gutschow: Fates of War in German Architecture - Losses, Damages, Reconstruction - Volume 2, South . Karl Wachholtz Verlag, Neumünster 1988, p. 812
 Georg Hartmann, Fried Lübbecke (ed.): Old Frankfurt. A legacy . Verlag Sauer and Auvermann, Glashütten 1971, pp. 72–77
 Hermann Heimpel: The salt house on Römerberg . In: Frankfurter Verkehrsverein (ed.): Frankfurter Wochenschau . Bodet & Link, Frankfurt am Main 1939, pp. 152–156
 Historical museum presents the art of carving from the "Salzhaus" . In: Frankfurter Allgemeine: Newspaper for Germany (ed.), Frankfurt am Main November 9, 2004
 Walter Sage: The community center in Frankfurt a. M. until the end of the Thirty Years' War. Wasmuth, Tübingen 1959 ( Das Deutsche Bürgerhaus 2), pp. 96–99
 Carl Wolff, Rudolf Jung: The Architectural Monuments of Frankfurt am Main - Volume 2, Secular Buildings . Selbstverlag / Völcker, Frankfurt am Main 1898, pp. 239–245

Notes

External links 

Frankfurt am Main in the air war
 View from the cathedral of the destroyed Römerberg, colour photographs by Paul Wolff in the summer of 1944
 FAZ article with u. a. new facts about the actual maintenance of the salt house
   (Archive from June 17, 2013 on the Internet Archive )

History of salt
Buildings and structures in Frankfurt
Renaissance architecture in Germany
Buildings and structures completed in 1600